The 1998 Chicago White Sox season was the White Sox's 99th season. They finished with a record of 80-82, good enough for 2nd place in the American League Central, 9 games behind the 1st place Cleveland Indians.

Offseason 
 December 10, 1997: Charlie O'Brien was signed as a free agent with the Chicago White Sox.
 January 27, 1998: Howard Battle was signed as a free agent with the Chicago White Sox.

Regular season

Opening Day lineup 
 Ray Durham, 2B
 Mike Cameron, CF
 Frank Thomas, DH
 Albert Belle, LF
 Robin Ventura, 3B
 Magglio Ordóñez, RF
 Greg Norton, 1B
 Charlie O'Brien, C
 Mike Caruso, SS
 Jaime Navarro, P

Season standings

Record vs. opponents

Notable transactions 
 May 27, 1998: Jim Abbott signed as a free agent with the Chicago White Sox.
 June 2, 1998: Aaron Rowand was drafted by the Chicago White Sox in the 1st round (35th pick) of the 1998 amateur draft. Player signed June 12, 1998.
 June 2, 1998: Mark Buehrle was drafted by the Chicago White Sox in the 38th round of the 1998 amateur draft. Player signed May 21, 1999.
 June 7, 1998: Howard Battle was released by the Chicago White Sox.
 July 16, 1998: Jason Bere was released by the Chicago White Sox.
 July 30, 1998: Charlie O'Brien was traded by the Chicago White Sox to the Anaheim Angels for Brian Tokarse (minors) and Jason Stockstill (minors).

Roster

Player stats

Batting 
Note: G = Games played; AB = At bats; R = Runs scored; H = Hits; 2B = Doubles; 3B = Triples; HR = Home runs; RBI = Runs batted in; BB = Base on balls; SO = Strikeouts; AVG = Batting average; SB = Stolen bases

Pitching 
Note: W = Wins; L = Losses; ERA = Earned run average; G = Games pitched; GS = Games started; SV = Saves; IP = Innings pitched; H = Hits allowed; R = Runs allowed; ER = Earned runs allowed; HR = Home runs allowed; BB = Walks allowed; K = Strikeouts

Farm system 

LEAGUE CHAMPIONS: Bristol

External links 
 1998 Chicago White Sox at Baseball Reference

References 

Chicago White Sox seasons
Chicago White Sox season
White